Tulalip Resort Casino is an Indian casino and resort in Quil Ceda Village, Washington, owned and operated by the Tulalip Tribes of Washington. It opened in 2003 as Tulalip Casino, and was renamed in late 2007 because of the new hotel, which opened August 15, 2008. In addition to the AAA Three Diamond award-winning 12-story hotel with 370 rooms and suites, the resort includes  of gaming space. The property has 7 restaurants: Blackfish, Blazing Paddles, Cedars Cafe, The Draft Bar and Grill, Journeys East,  Canoes Carvery, and Tula Bene.  The T Spa is the resort's onsite spa and features  of treatment rooms. There are also meeting facilities, and the Canoes Cabaret, Orca Ballroom, and Tulalip Amphitheatre for entertainment events.

Construction on the casino began in July 2001 and cost $78 million. The casino opened in June 2003. It replaced an earlier casino that opened in July 1992 and was later renamed to Quil Ceda Creek Casino after a renovation in 2004.

See also
List of casinos in Washington 
List of casinos in the United States 
List of casino hotels

References

External links 

Casinos completed in 2003
Hotel buildings completed in 2008
Native American casinos
Casinos in Washington (state)
Casino hotels
Buildings and structures in Snohomish County, Washington
Tourist attractions in Snohomish County, Washington
Tulalip Tribes